Malcolm Colin Press  (born 18 September 1958) is a British ecologist, professor and Vice-Chancellor of Manchester Metropolitan University (MMU), in the United Kingdom.

Education
Press was educated at Kingsbury High School. He studied environmental science at Westfield College, part of the University of London gaining a Bachelor of Science degree in 1980 followed by a PhD from the University of Manchester in 1984 supervised by John A. Lee. In 2008, he was awarded a Diploma in Spanish and Latin American studies from the University of Sheffield.

Career
Following his PhD, Press was a postdoctoral research associate at University College London (UCL) from 1985 to 1989. He was appointed a lecturer in 1989 at the University of Manchester and promoted to senior lecturer in 1992.

Service and leadership
Press moved to the University of Sheffield in 1994, where he served as a reader until 1998, then professor of physiological ecology, where he also served as head of the department of animal and plant sciences from 2002.

He was appointed Pro-vice-chancellor and head of the college of life and environmental sciences at the University of Birmingham in 2008. From 2013 he served as Birmingham's Pro-Vice-Chancellor for research and knowledge transfer.

Press was appointed Vice-Chancellor at MMU in June 2015 where he took over from John Brooks who held the post from 2005 to 2015.

Press served as president of the British Ecological Society from 2007 to 2009, and was awarded the BES president's medal in 2005. From 2009 to 2012, he served as a member of the council of the National Trust. Between 2012 and 2018, he served on the Board of Trustees at the Royal Botanic Gardens, Kew, appointed by Lord Taylor. From 2015 until 2021 he was a trustee of the World Wide Fund for Nature. In 2017, he was appointed chair of the Manchester Memorial Advisory Group, serving until 2020. In 2020, he was appointed a trustee of the British Council. He sits on the boards of UCAS, and the Institute for Apprenticeships and Technical Education. Press also sits on the boards of several university-linked businesses, including Manchester Science Partnerships, Health Innovation Manchester, and the Oxford Road Corridor.

Research
Press is internationally recognised as a researcher in the fields of sustainable agriculture, climate change and tropical forests. Highlights include:

 Impacts of atmospheric nitrogen deposition on upland vegetation (Sphagnum): his PhD was the first demonstration of the impact of pollutant nitrogen (nitrates and ammonium) on a British terrestrial ecosystem.
 Impacts of climate change on terrestrial Arctic ecosystems: community changes to temperature and nutrients are driven by the response of key species and their interactions.
 Interactions between parasitic plants and their cereal hosts in sub-Saharan Africa: control and mechanisms of tolerance and resistance.
 Impacts of parasitic plants on ecosystem structure and function: hemiparasites are keystone species and ecosystem engineers, shaping community structure through impacts on decomposition and nutrient cycling.
 Factors that control the regeneration of dipterocarp seedlings in Southeast Asian tropical rainforests.

Awards and honours
Press was appointed Commander of the Order of the British Empire (CBE) in the 2022 New Year Honours for "services to higher and technical education".

References 

1958 births
Living people
Academics of the University of Birmingham
British ecologists
People associated with Manchester Metropolitan University
Alumni of Westfield College
Alumni of the University of Manchester
Academics of the University of Manchester
Academics of the University of Sheffield
Commanders of the Order of the British Empire